Catherine Picard (born 14 August 1952) is a French politician and anti-cultist from the French Socialist Party. She was a member of the French National Assembly from 1997 to 2002.

Career 
Picard was elected on 1 June 1997 for the French Socialist Party and was responsible for public education. In 2001, together with centrist Senator Nicolas About, she drafted the About-Picard law.

In 2007, Picard was found guilty of slander against the Jehovah's Witnesses. In 2009, she became a Chevalier of the Legion of Honour.

Published works

References

External links 
 Official page at National Assembly website

People from La Garenne-Colombes
1952 births
Living people
Critics of new religious movements
Critics of Jehovah's Witnesses